Beach volleyball at the 2012 Asian Beach Games was held from 12 June to 18 June 2012 in Fengxiang Beach, Haiyang, China.

Medalists

Medal table

Results

Men

Preliminary round

Group A

Group B

Group C

Group D

Group E

Group F

Group G

Group H

Group I

Group J

Group K

Group L

Group M

Group N

Group O

Group P

Knockout round

Women

Preliminary round

Group S

Group T

Group U

Group V

Group W

Group X

Group Y

Group Z

Knockout round

References
 Official site
 Asian Volleyball Confederation

2012 Asian Beach Games events
Asian Beach Games
2012